Foolish Heart was a Canadian television series, which aired on CBC Television in 1999. The series, a short run dramatic anthology, was produced and written by Ken Finkleman following his earlier series The Newsroom and More Tears.

Although the episodes were linked by character interactions, each of the series' six episodes focused on a different character's family or romantic relationship problems. Finkleman also starred in the series as George Findlay, the same character he had played in The Newsroom and More Tears.

The series won Finkleman a 1999 Gemini Award for Best Direction in a Dramatic Series.

The cast also included Arsinée Khanjian, Sarah Strange, Tom McCamus, Nancy Beatty, Patricia O'Callaghan and Chris Benson.

Finkleman's next project for the CBC was the series Foreign Objects.

References

External links

1990s Canadian anthology television series
CBC Television original programming
1999 Canadian television series debuts
1999 Canadian television series endings
1990s Canadian drama television series
Television series created by Ken Finkleman